Bonifacio de Blas y Muñoz (1827 in Villacastín, Spain – 1880 in Madrid, Spain) was a Spanish politician and lawyer who served as Minister of State from 1871 to 1872, in a cabinet headed by Práxedes Mateo Sagasta, during the reign of King Amadeo I of Spain.

References
Spanish Senate. Personal dossier of D. Bonifacio de Blas

|-
 

Foreign ministers of Spain
1827 births
1880 deaths
Constitutional Party (Spain) politicians